Byron Earl Gettis (born March 13, 1980) is a former outfielder in Major League Baseball for the Kansas City Royals. Gettis graduated from Cahokia Senior High School in 1998, and was signed by the Kansas City Royals as an amateur free agent that same year. He had a career batting average of .179 in 39 at-bats. He was claimed off waivers by the Detroit Tigers on October 15, . He spent  between Double-A Erie and Triple-A Toledo, becoming a free agent after the season.

After the end of his baseball career, Gettis enrolled at Southern Illinois University at Carbondale in 2006. He joined the Salukis football team as a tight end, starting four games in 2007.

References

External links

SIU Athletics

1980 births
Living people
Major League Baseball outfielders
Baseball players from Illinois
Kansas City Royals players
Wichita Wranglers players
Omaha Royals players
Erie SeaWolves players
Toledo Mud Hens players
Southern Illinois Salukis football players
People from Centreville, Illinois
Gulf Coast Royals players
Charleston AlleyCats players
Wilmington Blue Rocks players
Burlington Bees players